Hannibal–LaGrange University (HLGU), formerly Hannibal–LaGrange College, is a private Christian university in Hannibal, Missouri. It is affiliated with the Missouri Baptist Convention, which is part of the Southern Baptist Convention. It enrolls 671 (2020) students and offers 29 majors.   Although the university is accredited by the Higher Learning Commission, it is currently on probation for issues related to its finances, governing board, and issues related to sufficiency of faculty and staff.

History
Hannibal–LaGrange University was created as the result of the 1928 merger of LaGrange College (founded in 1858 as the LaGrange Male and Female Seminary) in LaGrange, Missouri, and Hannibal College in Hannibal. In October 2022, the trustees at Hannibal–LaGrange University elected Robert Matz as the 18th president of the university. Living former presidents include Anthony W. Allen(17th president), Woodrow Burt (16th president), Paul Brown (15th president), and Larry Lewis (14th president), a graduate of Luther Rice Seminary, who left HLGU to be the president of the Southern Baptist Convention's Home Mission Board (now the North American Mission Board), one of the largest mission agencies in the world.

In 2010, the Missouri Baptist Convention voted to change the institution's name to Hannibal–LaGrange University after a bid to change the name to "University of Hannibal" was voted down.

As a Christian school, the university was granted an exception to Title IX in 2015 which allows it to legally discriminate against protected classes (religion, sexual orientation, gender identity).

Following several years of declining enrollment, Hannibal–LaGrange University experienced severe financial challenges in 2021 and 2022. These challenges were exacerbated by the COVID-19 pandemic with enrollment declining to 780 students in 2021, down from over 1,000 students a decade prior. The institution raised $1.5 million in the span of a few months in early 2022 but needed $2.2 million so numerous faculty and staff were fired, salaries reduced, retirement matching eliminated and programs closed. All faculty contracts were terminated as a result of the institution's declaration of financial exigency.

Academics
The university is accredited by the Higher Learning Commission. In November of 2022, the commission placed HLGU on probation because it determined that the institution is out of compliance with HLC requirements related to institutional resources, the (lack of) autonomy of its governing board, and insufficiency of faculty and staff. 

Hannibal–LaGrange University offers undergraduate programs and two fully online graduate programs, a Master of Science (M.S.) in Education and a Master of Arts (M.A.) in Leadership. HLGU's ADVANCE Degree Completion program is designed for working adults with an associate degree who want to complete their bachelor's degree in as little as 18 months.

In 2018, Hannibal–LaGrange University was ranked by U.S. News & World Report as the 62-80 best Midwest college in the regional colleges category. As of 2022 HLGU had been removed from the list entirely.

Athletics

The Hannibal–LaGrange athletic teams are called the Trojans. The university is a member of the National Association of Intercollegiate Athletics (NAIA), primarily competing in the American Midwest Conference (AMC) since the 1986–87 academic year. They are also a member of the National Christian College Athletic Association (NCCAA), primarily competing as an independent in the North-Central Region of the Division I level.

Hannibal–LaGrange competes in 8 intercollegiate varsity sports: Men's sports include baseball, basketball, cross country, soccer, and track & field; while women's sports include basketball, cross country, soccer, softball, track & field and volleyball; and co-ed sports include shotgun sports. Former sports include men's and women's golf, wrestling, swimming, and men's volleyball.

Notable alumni
 Jefferson R. Boulware, Illinois state representative and lawyer
 Clarence Cannon, Democratic Congress member
 Homer Martien Cook, president of Northwest Missouri State University
 Cotton Fitzsimmons, NBA and college basketball coach
 Asa Hodges, U.S. Representative
 Lindell Shumake, member of the Missouri House of Representatives
 Ashleigh Spencer, Australian basketball player who currently plays for the Bendigo Spirit in the Women's National Basketball League

References

External links
 Official website
 Official athletics website

 
1858 establishments in Missouri
Buildings and structures in Hannibal, Missouri
Education in Marion County, Missouri
Educational institutions established in 1858
Quincy–Hannibal area
Universities and colleges affiliated with the Southern Baptist Convention
Private universities and colleges in Missouri
Council for Christian Colleges and Universities